Vandicholai (Vandicholai; Tamil: வண்டிச்சோலை) is a Panchayat village in Coonoor Taluk of The Nilgiris District, Tamil Nadu, India. The settlement takes its name from a nearby Shola (indigenous forest). Though the adjective does not feature in the name, this is the Big Vandicholai; the Chinna Vandicholai (Small Vandicholai) is a settlement adjoining Wellington Cantonment. The village gets its name from the conjunction of two Badaga words [bandu+so:le; 'moth+woods'].

Geography
Vandicholai is identified as a tri-junction, with a tall traffic-illumination light at the junction (probably the only one so far in all of Coonoor). The tri-junction has recently been named Narain Karthikeyan Circle in honour of India's famous F-1 driver.
This tri-junction is located approximately 3.5 km from Sim's Park at Coonoor on MDR 1073 between Coonoor and Kotagiri; the third branch at the junction leads via Hallakarai to Aravenu which lies on SH 15 between Kotagiri and Metupalayam.

Just off the tri-junction when heading towards Hallakarai/Aravenu, a road branches off towards the Coonoor Ridge and Kodamalai reserve-forest, where Coonoor Tea-Estate and Adar Tea-Estate are located.
Another branch-road leads off of MDR 1073, linking Vandicholai directly to Wellington Cantonment via Forest Dale.

When driving from Coonoor to Kotagiri, the village is succeeded by Yedapalli.
On the road to Hallakarai/Aravenu, Belatti-Mattam is the next village at about 2-km.
Kodamalai-Hatty is the adjoining village due south of Vandicholai.

Technically, the tri-junction and the associated village lie at the shallow saddle between the Coonoor Ridge on the South, and the Black-Ridge - Yedapalli peak on the North. Consequently, there is no water source that originates here. The run-off from the Yedapalli marsh flows along the northern boundary of the village with Yedapalli, and into SpringField Tea Estate. Two of these streams create water-falls along the road to Forest-Dale. These are a pretty sight during the rainy season.

Providence College for Women is located close to the tri-junction.

The village precincts lie inside the municipality-limits of Coonoor town.

Demography
Vandicholai has few (if any) traditional/autochthonous inhabitants.
Most of the population is Sri Lankan Tamils in two or three separate pockets.
As of the 2011 census, the population is 1073. The literacy rate is 57%.

The residents speak Tamil. Badaga and English are understood, not spoken;

Occupation
The residents of the settlements pick tea from privately owned gardens as unorganised labour, including in the neighbouring Coonoor Tea-Estate, or as domestic help in the up-market Elk-Hill Estate short of the tri-junction.

There is no industry in Vandicholai.

Famous For
Vandicholai is home to the Chinna Balaji Tirupati/Sri Venkatachalapathy Temple, short of the tri-junction by about 350-m when driving up from Coonoor.

A traditional Arulmigu Bathrakaliamman temple (அருள்மிகு பத்ரகாளியம்மன் டெம்பிள்) lies on the main road leading out of Vandicholai to Kotagiri.

The Sri Sarada Brahmavidya Kendra (ஷர்தா ப்ரம்ஹவித்யா கேந்திரா) is located off the tri-junction on the road climbing up towards the Adar Tea Estate. This centre teaches Brahman - the knowledge of Advaita Vedanta. The centre was founded by Pujya Swami Yogeshwaranandaji Maharaj in 1962. The place was then known as “Vinona Kutir”, gradually renamed to “Swamiyar Bungalow” – the residence of a Swami. The centre was formalised in 1980 by registering the “Sri Sarada Brahmavidya Kendra” as a society.

Providence College for Women is located short of the tri-junction. Founded in 1966 by Mother Marie Theresse, the college was then affiliated to the University of Madras. The college is affiliated to the Bharathiar University, Coimbatore.

Cafe-Diem is a Mediterranean-cuisine specialised eatery run from a home inside a gated community titled Camelot Heights.

References

Villages in Nilgiris district